Kosmos 76 ( meaning Cosmos 76), also known as DS-P1-Yu No.3 was a Soviet satellite which was used as a radar calibration target for tests of anti-ballistic missiles. It was built by the Yuzhnoye Design Bureau, and launched in 1965 as part of the Dnepropetrovsk Sputnik programme.

Kosmos 76 was launched using a Kosmos-2I 63S1 carrier rocket, which flew from Site 86/1 at Kapustin Yar. The launch occurred at 04:33 GMT on 23 July 1965.

It decayed from orbit on 16 March 1966. Kosmos 76 was the third of seventy nine DS-P1-Yu satellites to be launched, of which all but seven were successful. It replaced the previous satellite, DS-P1-Yu No.2, launched on 12 February 1965, which had failed to reach orbit due to a second stage malfunction

See also

 1965 in spaceflight

References

Spacecraft launched in 1965
Kosmos 0076
1965 in the Soviet Union
Dnepropetrovsk Sputnik program